Great Mourning is a 1953 Soviet documentary film.

Plot 
The film tells about the funeral arrangements associated with the death of Joseph Stalin.

Starring 
 Joseph Stalin as himself
 Lavrentiy Beria as himself
 Georgy Malenkov as himself
 Vyacheslav Molotov as himself

References

External links 
 

1953 documentary films
1953 films
Films scored by Aram Khachaturian
1950s Russian-language films
Soviet documentary films